Hendrick Motorsports (HMS) is an American professional auto racing organization that competes in the NASCAR Cup Series. The team was founded in 1984 as All Star Racing by Rick Hendrick. Hendrick Motorsports has won a NASCAR-record 293 Cup Series races and 14 Cup Series owners and drivers championships to go with three Truck Series owners and drivers titles and one Xfinity Series drivers crown. Additionally, the team has 26 Xfinity Series race wins, 26 Truck Series race wins, and 7 ARCA Menards Series race wins.

For 2023, Hendrick Motorsports fields four full-time Cup Series teams with the Chevrolet Camaro ZL1; the No. 5 for Kyle Larson, the No. 9 for Chase Elliott, the No. 24 for William Byron, and the No. 48 for Alex Bowman. The team formerly fielded teams in the now-NASCAR Xfinity Series before merging its efforts with JR Motorsports before returning on a part-time basis in 2022. Hendrick Motorsports also fielded several trucks in the NASCAR Craftsman Truck Series, most recently for development driver Chase Elliott in 2013. The team has fielded cars in the past for many NASCAR drivers, including Hall of Famers Jeff Gordon, Mark Martin, Terry Labonte, Darrell Waltrip, Benny Parsons, Dale Earnhardt Jr., and 7-time Cup champion Jimmie Johnson, and others such as Geoff Bodine, Tim Richmond, Ricky Rudd, Ken Schrader, Ricky Craven, Jerry Nadeau, Joe Nemechek, Kyle Busch, Casey Mears, and Kasey Kahne. HMS maintains an in-house engine shop, with the team leasing some of their engines to technical alliance partner JTG Daugherty Racing.

History

What is now Hendrick Motorsports was founded prior to the 1984 season by Rick Hendrick, a Charlotte, North Carolina-based car dealership owner who currently operates a network of dealerships called Hendrick Auto Group. The team was formed along with longtime crew chief and car builder Harry Hyde, NHRA and NASCAR team owner Raymond Beadle, and music entrepreneur C.K. Spurlock as All-Star Racing. The team, called Hendrick Motorsports (HMS) by 1985, was heavily involved with the GM Goodwrench IMSA GTP Corvette and twin-turbo V6 engine development effort and competed in the IMSA GTP series from 1985 through 1988 with drivers Doc Bundy and Sarel van der Merwe. Hendrick and GM abandoned the project in 1988.

HMS expanded its NASCAR efforts to two full-time cars in 1986, three in 1987, and four in 2002. HMS was one of the first teams in NASCAR to be successful operating multiple entries, based on the model used at the Hendrick dealerships. The team has also been credited for innovations in engine construction and pit crew training.  In 2020, Hendrick partnered with AdvoCare in their performance and fitness teams.

Hendrick (as All-Star Racing) won its first race in 1984 at Martinsville with the No. 5 driven by Geoff Bodine. At the 2021 Coca-Cola 600, Hendrick became the winningest team in NASCAR Cup Series history when it won its 269th race with the No. 5 driven by Kyle Larson. This eclipsed the record held by Petty Enterprises at 268 wins, which had held the record of the winningest team in the series since 1960.

NASCAR Cup Series

NASCAR Xfinity Series
Hendrick Motorsports fielded in-house entries in the Busch Series from 1984 to 1990, and again from 2000 to 2007, primarily the No. 5 entry. Following the conclusion of the 2007 racing season, Hendrick and JR Motorsports (owned by Hendrick driver Dale Earnhardt Jr.) officially combined Xfinity Series operations. The No. 5 Chevrolets began running full-time under the JR Motorsports banner in 2008, and the team receives engines and technical support from Hendrick Motorsports, with several HMS employees moving to JR Motorsports. Rick Hendrick continues to be listed as car owner of the No. 5 team. JRM and HMS also collaborate in the areas of partnership development, sponsorship services, marketing, and media relations.

Car No. 5 history
Part-time (1984–1990)
Hendrick began competing in the 1984 debut season of the Busch Series, fielding the No. 15 car for seventeen races with sponsorship coming from Levi Garrett, with Cup Series driver Geoff Bodine running twelve of them. Bodine would score Hendrick their first win in the Busch Series at Rockingham Speedway. Ron Bouchard, Dick Trickle, Glenn Jarrett all ran one race, while Tim Richmond ran two, with one of them being in a No. 0 Car. In 1985, Brett Bodine ran the majority of races for the team in 1985, running one in the No. 15 and twelve in the No. 5. The Younger Bodine brother would win 3 races for the team. Geoff Bodine ran five races, one in the No. 15, and one in the No. 5. Bodine won the season opener Goody's 300. Tim Richmond ran 2 races in the No. 15, winning once at Charlotte. In 1986, the team ran 7 races, 3 with Bodine and Richmond, and 1 with Rob Moroso. Richmond would get the teams only win of the year at Charlotte. In 1987, the team ran 9 races utilizing the No. 15. 8 of them were driven by Geoff Bodine, and 1 of them with the team's owner Rick Hendrick. While Hendrick would DNF in his start, Bodine would once again win the season opener at Daytona. The team ran 8 races as the No. 15 in 1988 with Geoff Bodine being the only driver, Bodine would win once at Darlington Raceway. In 1989, the team would only run 5 races, with Geoff Bodine and Ken Schrader driving. While Schrader would DNF his 2 starts, Bodine would once again get a single win at Darlington. The team only ran 3 races in 1990 for the shooting of Days of Thunder. Greg Sacks drove the No. 46 twice and the No. 15 once, getting a best finish of 2nd at Charlotte. After the 1990 season, Hendrick shut down their Busch Series operations for the time being.

Ricky Hendrick (2002)

The current No. 5 car debuted as the No. 14 JG Motorsports in 2000, with Rick Hendrick's son Ricky Hendrick finishing 39th in the season finale at Homestead. 

The number was switched to No. 5 when the car began competing full-time in 2002. After Ricky was injured in a wreck at Las Vegas, Ron Hornaday Jr. took over for the next six races before Hendrick returned at Richmond. Toward the end of the season, Hendrick suddenly announced his retirement from driving due to lingering effects from the crash, but he remained as car owner until his death in 2004. David Green finished out the season for the team.

Brian Vickers (2003)
Ricky Hendrick selected 19-year-old Brian Vickers to drive the No. 5 car in 2003. Vickers won three races and the Busch Series championship, finishing just 14 points ahead of Hendrick test driver and former No. 5 team spotter David Green.

Kyle Busch (2004)
When Vickers moved up to the Cup Series, Kyle Busch became the No. 5 car's driver after he had run seven races the previous season. In his rookie year, Busch won five races and was runner-up to Martin Truex Jr. in points. He moved up to the Cup Series after the season, but he continued to drive the No. 5 Busch Series car part-time for several more years. 

Multiple Drivers (2005–2006)
Adrián Fernández drove the car for six races in 2005, finishing tenth at Autódromo, his only top ten finish of the season. Hendrick development drivers Blake Feese, Boston Reid, and Kyle Krisiloff also periodically drove the No. 5 car, running a combined fifteen races. Busch and Jimmie Johnson ran the rest of the schedule, with Busch winning at Lowe's. As for Fernandez, Feese, Reid, and Krisiloff, the 4 drivers driving the 5 car combined 21 starts scored no wins, no top 5's, and only one top 10 with a combined average of 31.2 and had 10 DNF's which made Rick Hendrick put his driver development program on hold. 

In 2006, Busch drove 34 of 35 races, winning at Bristol and finishing seventh in points. Justin Labonte drove for 1 race at Memphis.

Part Time (2007)
In 2007, Busch ran the No. 5 on a part-time basis, sharing the ride with Mark Martin, Landon Cassill, Casey Mears, and Adrián Fernández, running a total of 26 races. The car carried a number of different sponsors including Lowe's, Delphi, Spectrum, and Hendrick Autoguard. Busch drove the car to victory lane four times in 2007, while Martin finished second twice in three races.

JR Motorsports (2008–2018)

The No. 5 team moved to JR Motorsports in 2008, and featured eight drivers, including Johnson and Earnhardt Jr., and four primary sponsors in its first year. In 2009, the No. 5 car ran a part-time schedule due to sponsorship limitations. Fastenal, Unilever and GoDaddy.com sponsored seven different drivers over the course of the season. A variety of drivers ran the car in subsequent NASCAR Xfinity Series seasons until it was shut down for the 2019 season.

Car No. 5 results

Car No. 17 history

Part Time (2022–Present)
On June 2, 2022, Hendrick Motorsports announced it would field the No. 17 in three Xfinity races in 2022, with Kyle Larson running at Road America, Alex Bowman at Indianapolis, and William Byron at Watkins Glen. This marked HMS' return to the Xfinity Series after Tony Stewart won for the team at Daytona in 2009. Larson dominated at Road America, but eventually lost to Ty Gibbs on the final lap. Bowman ran the car at the Indianapolis road course, but it again finished second, this time to A. J. Allmendinger. At Watkins Glen, Byron fiercely battled Gibbs for the lead throughout most of the race until they both spun off-course during the final restart, resulting in Byron finishing 25th. At the September Darlington race, Larson finished fifth after engaging in a three-car battle with Noah Gragson and Sheldon Creed over the closing laps. Larson attempted a pass on Creed for the lead on the final lap, only for both to be passed by race-winner Gragson.

On March 8, 2023, Hendrick Motorsports announced that, for the second year in a row, it would field the No. 17 in four Xfinity in 2023, with William Byron running at Circuit of the Americas, Kyle Larson at Sonoma and Darlington, and Alex Bowman at Watkins Glen.

Car No. 17 results

Car No. 24 History

JG Motorsports (1999–2000)
The No. 24 team started in 1999 with Gordon-Evernham Motorsports, owned by Jeff Gordon and crew chief Ray Evernham. Gordon and Ricky Hendrick combined to compete in 10 races. In 2000, Rick Hendrick bought out Evernham's share, renaming the team JG Motorsports. Gordon and Ricky Hendrick once again shared the ride, with Hendrick running 15 events. The team also formed an alliance with Cicci-Welliver Racing.

Part Time (2001)
Hendrick Motorsports took full control of the team in 2001, with GMAC Financial Services sponsoring the No. 24 team in each of its three races. Ricky Hendrick drove in those 3 races. In 2002, Hendrick moved to the No. 5 Busch Series car and three-time truck series champion Jack Sprague took over the No. 24 full-time.

Jack Sprague (2002)
Sprague ran the full 2002 season, bringing truck series sponsor NetZero with him. He earned three poles and a win at Nashville en route to a fifth-place points finish. Sprague moved to Hendrick-affiliated Haas CNC Racing in 2003.

Part Time (2007)
In 2007, the No. 24 returned with Casey Mears and Landon Cassill as the drivers, with the National Guard providing sponsorship. After the 2007 season, the team shut down.

Car No. 24 results

Car No. 48 history
Part Time With Jimmie Johnson (2004–2007)
The 48 car made its debut in the Busch Series in 2004 at Lowe's Motor Speedway, running a one-race deal with sponsorship from Lowe's and The SpongeBob SquarePants Movie. Jimmie Johnson drove it to a third-place finish. He drove the car for five races in 2005, winning a pole at Lowe's. During 2006, he started three races, both Lowe's races and the Ameriquest 300 at California. His best finish was seventh in the first Lowe's race. Johnson drove the 48 car in the same three Busch races for the 2007 races, with a best finish of fourth at California.

Car No. 48 results

Car No. 57 history
Part Time (2005–2006)
In 2005, Hendrick Motorsports fielded the No. 57, a number taken from the sponsorship of Heinz and its "57 varieties". Several drivers piloted the No. 57 in 2005 and 2006, with Brian Vickers competing in the majority of races. Additional sponsors, including Lowe's and Mountain Dew, signed deals to sponsor the team for certain races.

Car No. 57 results

Car No. 80 history
Part Time With Tony Stewart (2009)
In 2009, Hendrick Motorsports announced that they would run a No. 80 HendrickCars.com Chevy driven by Tony Stewart in the Xfinity Series Camping World 300 at Daytona. The number 80 represented the number of affiliates in the Hendrick Automotive Group. Stewart won the race in this car, with this being his only race for Hendrick Motorsports while focusing on his team in a partnership with Gene Haas. Stewart-Haas Racing, at the time, received engines, chassis, and technical support from Hendrick Motorsports.

Car No. 80 results

Car No. 87 history

Part Time With Developmental Drivers (2003–2004)
In 2003, 18-year-old development driver Kyle Busch made his entry into Busch Series, driving a No. 87 car in seven races in an alliance with NEMCO Motorsports (owned by then-Hendrick driver Joe Nemechek). The car received sponsorship from GMAC company Ditech.com, and Busch scored three top tens including two-second-place finishes.

For 2004, the alliance with NEMCO continued. Development drivers Blake Feese and Boston Reid ran 3 races each in the No. 87 ditech.com Chevy, with a best finish of 26th by Reid at Atlanta Motor Speedway.

Car No. 87 results

 Includes points earned by NEMCO Motorsports. Only results under Hendrick Motorsports are shown.

NASCAR Camping World Truck Series

Truck No. 5 history
In 1995, the team fielded the No. 5 DuPont Chevrolet part-time for Terry Labonte. He won once at Richmond. Roger Mears drove the No. 5 truck once at Mesa Marin Raceway sponsored by Budweiser.

Truck No. 5 results

Truck No. 17 history
The No. 17 Craftsman Truck Series team made its debut in 2000 with Ricky Hendrick driving with GMAC/Quaker State sponsorship. He made six races that season and finished in the top-ten four times. In 2001, Hendrick won his only career Truck race at Kansas Speedway, becoming the youngest driver at the time to win a truck race at age 21. He finished sixth in points, runner-up to Travis Kvapil for Rookie of the Year honors. The team did not run after 2001.

Truck No. 17 results

Truck No. 24 history
The No. 24 truck debuted with the Truck Series in 1995 with Scott Lagasse driving and DuPont sponsoring. Lagasse posted two top-fives and finished ninth in the standings.

In 1996, Jack Sprague drove the No. 24 full-time with Quaker State sponsoring. He won five races and was second in the points. The following season, he won three times and clinched his first NASCAR championship.

The team lost the Quaker State sponsorship after 1997 but signed GMAC Financial as a sponsor after a one-race deal with Big Daddy's BBQ Sauce. He won an additional five races but lost the championship by three points. In 1999, Sprague won the championship again but fell to fifth in 2000. In 2001, NetZero came on board as the team's sponsor, and Sprague won his third championship. After Sprague moved his ride to the Busch Series, Ron Hornaday Jr. drove the No. 24 in a one-race deal at Daytona, finishing twelfth. The team closed after that race to focus on its Busch Series efforts.

Truck No. 24 results

Truck No. 25 history
In 1995, the team fielded the No. 25 Budweiser Chevrolet part-time with Hendrick Sr. and Roger Mears driving. Midway through the season, Jack Sprague came on board to finish out the season for the team, winning a pole at Phoenix International Raceway. In seven races, Sprague had three top-5 and five top-10 finishes.

Truck No. 25 results

Truck No. 94 history

Hendrick Motorsports revived its truck program in 2013, fielding a part-time entry for Chase Elliott. The team was sponsored by Aaron's and ran nine races. The trucks were not built directly by Hendrick Motorsports, but were instead provided by Hendrick-affiliated Turner Scott Motorsports. However, the trucks were fielded directly by Hendrick, with crew chief Lance McGrew. Elliott made his debut at Martinsville Speedway on April 6 and finished in the sixth position. Elliott became the youngest pole winner in Truck Series history at the time at Bristol in August, and later the youngest race winner in the Truck Series at the time by winning the inaugural Chevrolet Silverado 250 at Canadian Tire Motorsports Park. Elliott departed the No. 94 to join JR Motorsports in the Nationwide Series in 2014.

Truck No. 94 results

ARCA Racing Series
Hendrick fielded cars for five ARCA races from 1985 to 1996, twice for Brett Bodine in 1985 and 1986 (who won the pole for both races), and once each for Tommy Ellis (1988), Jack Sprague (1996), and Rick Hendrick himself. Rick Hendrick drove the No. 15 Tide car at Heartland Park Topeka in 1991, starting third and finishing 23rd after a braking issue in his only career ARCA start. In February 2000, Ricky Hendrick made his Daytona stock car in the ARCA Bondo/Mar-Hyde Series, driving the No. 17 GMAC Chevrolet to a fifth-place finish. Hendrick would run the race again the next year in the renumbered 71 car, finishing 9th.

Car No. 9 history

In 2012, Hendrick began fielding the No. 9 Chevrolet for development driver Chase Elliott, with father Bill Elliott as the listed owner and sponsorship from Aaron's, Inc. Longtime HMS crew chief Lance McGrew served as the team's crew chief. Elliott made his debut at age 16 at Mobile International Speedway, scoring a pole and six top tens in six races.

Elliott returned to the team in 2013, scoring his first career win at Pocono Raceway. Elliott, at age 17, became the youngest superspeedway winner in ARCA Racing Series history, beating fellow 17-year-old Erik Jones. Elliott scored four top tens, including the win at Pocono, in five races in 2013.

Elliott ran the 2014 ARCA season opener at Daytona, in order to gain NASCAR approval to run the Nationwide Series race the next week. Sponsored by HendrickCars.com and NAPA Brakes, Elliott was involved in a 15-car crash on the 13th lap. In spite of that, Elliott finished 9th, and NASCAR approved him to run on superspeedways; he would go on to win the Nationwide Series Championship.

Car No. 87 history
In 2003, Hendrick fielded Kyle Busch in the ARCA RE/MAX Series for  seven races. Busch drove the No. 87 Ditech.com Chevrolet (the same car he drove in his Busch Series starts) to three poles and two wins. Busch ran the 2004 season opener at Daytona, starting second and finishing first.

For the rest of 2004, development drivers Blake Feese, Boston Reid, and Kyle Krisiloff ran a combined ten races in ARCA in the No. 5, No. 6, and No. 7 cars fielded by Bobby Gerhart Racing. Feese scored a win at Nashville, while Krisiloff scored a victory at Chicagoland Speedway. Later that season, Feese ran a single race in the No. 94 Carquest Auto Parts Chevy out of the Hendrick stable at Talladega, scoring the victory.

Kyle Krisiloff ran the No. 7 Bobby Gerhart Racing Chevy in 14 races in 2005, with sponsorship from Ditech.com and Delphi. Krisiloff scored 3 top fives and five top tens. Blake Feese also ran the Daytona season opener in the 94 car, and was involved in a pit road crash that injured four photographers.

In 2007, Hendrick Motorsports resurrected the No. 87 for development driver Landon Cassill, with sponsorship from Stanley Tools. Cassill attempted three races (failing to qualify at Talladega) with two top ten starts but finishes of 38th at Kentucky and 32nd at Pocono. Cassill and Stanley would move to the 88 under the JR Motorsports banner for 2008.

ARCA Series wins

2003

 PFG Lester 150 at Nashville Superspeedway – Kyle Busch
 The Channel 5 205 at Kentucky Speedway – Kyle Busch

2004

 Advance Discount Auto Parts 200 at Daytona International Speedway – Kyle Busch
 PFG Lester 150 at Nashville Superspeedway – Blake Feese
 ReadyHosting.com 200 at Chicagoland Speedway – Kyle Krisiloff
 Food World 300 at Talladega Superspeedway – Blake Feese

2013

 Pocono ARCA 200 at Pocono Raceway – Chase Elliott

Plane crash

On October 24, 2004, ten people associated with Hendrick Motorsports lost their lives in a plane crash while en route from Concord, North Carolina, to a small airport near the Martinsville Speedway. The plane crashed in heavy fog into Bull Mountain, seven miles (11 km) from the Blue Ridge Airport in Stuart, Virginia, after a failed attempt to land. Ten people aboard the Beechcraft King Air 200 died. Six were Hendrick family members and/or Hendrick Motorsports employees: John Hendrick, the owner's brother and president of Hendrick Motorsports; Jeff Turner, general manager of Hendrick Motorsports; Ricky Hendrick, a Hendrick Motorsports driver and its owner's son; Kimberly and Jennifer Hendrick, John Hendrick's twin daughters; and Randy Dorton, chief engine builder. Also dead were the plane's pilots, Richard Tracy and Elizabeth Morrison, Joe Jackson, director of the DuPont Motorsports program, and Scott Lathram, who worked for Joe Gibbs Racing as a helicopter pilot.

NASCAR officials learned of the crash during that day's Subway 500 race in Martinsville, Virginia; they withheld the information from drivers until the end of the race, which was won by Hendrick driver Jimmie Johnson. For the rest of the 2004 season, all Hendrick Motorsports cars and the No. 0 Haas CNC Racing car featured pictures of the crash victims on the hood, accompanied by the phrase "Always in our hearts".

References

External links

 
 
 

1984 establishments in North Carolina
American auto racing teams
Companies based in North Carolina
Companies established in 1984
NASCAR teams
ARCA Menards Series teams
Auto racing teams established in 1984